Jean-Paul Aubé (3 July 1837 – 23 August 1916) was a French sculptor.

Aubé was born in Longwy, north eastern France, and educated at the Ecole des Beaux-Arts.

He died at Capbreton.

Main works
 Dante, 1879, plaster, model of the bronze statue of the place Marcellin Berthelot, to the Collège de France in Paris
 Buste de hollandaise, La Piscine (museum of art and industry)
 La Comtesse Hallez, Musée d'Orsay
 Monument à Léon Gambetta, erected in the Cour of Napoleon of the Louvre, a 27-meter monument inaugurated on 14 July 1888, permanently removed from the court of Napoleon in 1954.
   La statue de J.B.Colbert aux Manufactures des Gobelins.

Gallery

References

External links

 

1837 births
1916 deaths
People from Longwy
20th-century French sculptors
20th-century French male artists
19th-century French sculptors
19th-century French male artists
French male sculptors